Felix Chidi Odili (born 27 October 1990) is a Nigerian footballer who plays as forward.

Club career

Vasco
Felix Chidi started his career in India by playing for Vasco in Goa Professional League in 2012. It was not an ideal start, as Vasco got relegated.

Josco
In 2013 he signed for I-League 2nd Division side Josco. He scored his first goal for the club in a 1–2 loss against Simla Youngs. He added another goal against his name in the club's 0–1 victory over PIFA.

Eagles
He signed for I-League 2nd Division club Eagles FC from Kerala in 2014 where he scored 2 goals in 4 matches.

Calangute Association
In 2014 after the end of I-League 2nd Division he signed for Goa Professional League club Calangute Association. He stayed there for two seasons. He scored 4 goals in first season with the club. His second season with them was successful; he scored 9 goals in 2015–16 Goa Professional League finishing second in top scorer list.

Dempo
In January 2016 Felix joined newly relegated side Dempo in I-League 2nd Division as replacement of injured Josimar Martins. He finished as joint top scorer with 7 goals in 2015–16 I-League 2nd Division which helped Dempo to get promotion to I-League. Following that he played 
GPL for Dempo and was the second highest scorer with 8 goals.

NEROCA
After Dempo withdrew from 2016–17 I-League, he signed for I-League 2nd Division club NEROCA. NEROCA won the 2015–16 I-League 2nd Division and once again Felix finished the season as joint high scorer of the league with 9 goals. Following the promotion to the I-League the club renewed his contract for another season.

Kelantan
In January 2020, Felix joined Malaysia club Kelantan FA for one season.

Sudeva Delhi
In 2022, he signed with I-League club Sudeva Delhi.

Career statistics

Club

Honours

Club
Dempo
I-League 2nd div: 2015–16
NEROCA 
I-League 2nd div: 2016–17

Individual
I-League 2nd div top scorer: 2015–16, 2016–17

References

1990 births
Living people
Nigerian footballers
Expatriate footballers in India
Nigerian expatriate sportspeople in India
I-League players
Nigerian expatriate footballers
Association football forwards
Sportspeople from Warri
NEROCA FC players
Dempo SC players
Vasco SC players
Calcutta Football League players
Kelantan F.C. players